The European Green Party (EGP), also referred to as European Greens, is the European political party that represents national parties from across Europe who share Green values. The European Greens works closely with the Greens–European Free Alliance (Greens/EFA) parliamentary group in the European parliament which is formed by elected Green party members along with the European Free Alliance, European Pirate Party and Volt Europa. The European Greens' partners include its youth wing the Federation of Young European Greens (FYEG), the Greens European Foundation (GEF) and the Global Greens family.

History 
Green politics emerged from grassroots political movements, such as the environmental, peace, and women's rights movements. They forged the Greens' political priorities: climate change, peace, environment, democracy, social justice and health. Greens emerged as a new political force in the 1970s in several European countries and have been represented in the European Parliament since 1984.

The European Green Party was founded at the 4th Congress of the European Federation of Green Parties on 20–22 February 2004 in Rome, as the evolution of this already existing federation. The foundation of the new party was finalised with the signing of the treaty constituting the party. 32 Green parties from across Europe joined this new pan-European party. The Greens were the first to form a political party at the European level.

The European political party amplifies the political expression of member parties by having common policy positions, mutual election manifestos, and cohesive European election campaigns. The European Greens also has networks which brings Green politicians together, such as the Local Councillors Network.

The current presence of European Greens member parties in national governments is the highest in history. They are now in government in 8 countries in Europe: Austria (Die Grünen), Belgium (Groen and Ecolo), Finland (Vihreät De Gröna), Germany (Bündnis 90/Die Grünen), the Republic of Ireland (Comhaontas Glas), Luxembourg (déi gréng), Montenegro (Građanski Pokret URA) and Scotland (Scottish Greens).

Representation 

The table below shows the results of the Greens for the six direct elections to the European Parliament, in terms of seats and votes. It also shows how many European Commissioners the European Greens have, who led the parliamentary group. It also lists how the Green parliamentary group and supra-national organisations was named and what European parliamentary group they joined.

Organisational structure 

The European Green Party is a European political party, constituted out of political parties from European countries. Parties can also become associate members. Members of the Greens/EFA group in the European Parliament not belonging to a member party can be admitted as a special member with speaking rights but no vote.

The governing bodies of the EGP are the Council and the Committee.
The Council takes place twice a year and is the main decision-making body of the European Greens and consists of delegates of member parties. During Councils, delegates from European Greens parties set a common political direction, linked to the development of the European project and its values. They do so by debating and vote on resolutions on key issues in Europe. Delegates are allotted based on their most recent European or national election results. Each party has at least two delegates. consists of delegates of member parties. These are allotted on the basis of their most recent European or national election results. Each party has at least two delegates.
The Committee consists of nine members, including two Co-Chairs (one man and one woman), a Secretary General and a Treasurer. They are responsible for daily political affairs, execution of the Council's decisions and the activities of the EGP office and staff. Co-Chairs Thomas Waitz and Mélanie Vogel, Secretary General Benedetta De Marte, Treasurer Ute Michel, and Committee Members Vula Tsetsi, Sibylle Steffan, Małgorzata Tracz, Rasmus Nordqvist and Mina Jack Tolu were elected at the 35th European Green Party in Riga, Latvia. The EGP has had several Co-Chairs.

Co-chairs of the European Greens 

The Congress is an enlarged meeting of the Council which is convened by the Council at least once every 5 years and hosts more delegates.

Networks 
The EGP hosts a collection of networks that have specific special interest focus, including:

 Balkan Network
 Mediterranean Network
 Gender Network
 European Queer Greens
 Local Councillors Networks
 European Green Disability Network
 European Network of Green Seniors

Guidelines

Charter 
According to its charter, the European Greens is working towards a just and sustainable transition towards societies "respectful of human rights and built upon the values of environmental responsibility, freedom, justice, diversity and non-violence". The charter’s guiding principles provide a framework for the political actions taken by member parties.  

The priorities outlined in the charter include protecting human health and wellbeing, maintaining biological diversity, combatting global warming, transitioning to a just and sustainable economy, strengthening inclusive democracies, safeguarding diversity, and ensuring social justice.

Statutes   
The European Green Party statutes define the party in legal terms.

Membership 
As of July 2022, the European Greens has 36 member parties in 32 countries.

Full members

Candidate members

Associate members

Former members

Ideology and positions 
The European Greens have committed themselves to the basic tenets of Green politics, such as environmental responsibility, individual freedom, inclusive democracy, diversity, social justice, gender equality, global sustainable development and non-violence.

The European Greens was the first European political party to form, signalling its commitment to the European project. In its charter, it nevertheless affirms that the political party is working to make the European Union more just, democratic and inclusive.

European election campaigns

Manifestos 
2019: Time to renew the promise of Europe.  

2014: Change Europe, Vote Green.  

2009: A Green New Deal for Europe.

2004: Europe Can Do Better. You Decide!

1999: A Common Green Manifesto for the 1999 European Elections.

1994: Election Platform – Green Parties of the EU.

Results 
The candidates for the 2019 European Parliament election were Ska Keller and Bas Eickhout, who campaigned for climate protection, a social Europe, more democracy and stronger rule of law. That year, the Greens made the strongest ever showing across Europe, in part due to rising public awareness about climate change and the impact of youth movements for climate. The strongest surge was in Germany as Alliance 90/The Greens replaced the centre-left Social Democratic Party of Germany as the second-strongest party. The Greens/EFA group in the European Parliament obtained 74 seats in total. The Greens' results signified a new balance of power as the European People's Party (EPP) and the Progressive Alliance of Socialists and Democrats (S&D) lost their majority.

In the 2014 European Parliament election the Green candidates were José Bové and Ska Keller. These elections marked the first time there were primaries including Spitzenkandidaten at the European elections, which allows Europeans to not only vote for who should represent them in the European Parliament, but also help to decide who should lead the European Commission. In May they presented a common programme including the Green New Deal at the launch of the European Greens' campaign which called for "a new direction of economic policy aimed at reducing our carbon footprint and improving our quality of life". The slogan of the campaign was 'Change Europe, vote Green'. The Greens/EFA group in the European Parliament obtained 50 seats in total.

In the 2009 European Parliament election, even though the European Parliament was reduced in size, the European Greens' member parties won 46 seats, the best result of the Green Parties in 30 years. The Greens/EFA group in the European Parliament secured 55 seats in total.

In the 2004 European Parliament election, member parties won 35 Seats and the Greens/EFA group in the European Parliament secured 43 in total.

Green representation

European institutions

Election results

Partnerships 

 Federation of Young European Greens
 Greens/EFA group in the European Parliament
 Global Greens
 Green European Foundation

See also 

 Alter-globalization
 Anti-nuclear movement
 Club of Rome
 Common good (economics)
 Communalism
 Ecofeminism
 Ecological economics
 Environmental movement
 Ethics of care
 Participatory economics
 Political ecology
 Tobin tax
 Universal Basic Income
 Via Campesina

Notes

References

External links 

 European Greens website

2004 establishments in Europe
Political parties established in 2004
 

Pan-European political parties
The Greens–European Free Alliance
Criticisms of bullfighting
Pan-European Pro-European political parties